Max Dean is the name of:

Max Dean (artist)
Max Dean (footballer)